Benjamin Price may refer to:
Benjamin Price (cricketer)
Benjamin D. Price, architect
Benjamin Price (bishop) (1804–1896), first bishop of the Free Church of England
Benjamin Price (merchant) in Province of Quebec
Ben Price (journalist) on List of George Polk Award winners
Ben Price (born 1972), British actor

Characters
Benjamin Price, character in Ravenswood
Benjamin Price, Law&Order character played by Graham Patrick Martin

See also